Messier 18 or M18, also designated NGC 6613, is an open cluster of stars in the constellation Sagittarius. It was discovered by Charles Messier in 1764 and included in his list of comet-like objects. From the perspective of Earth, M18 is situated between the Omega Nebula (M17) and the Small Sagittarius Star Cloud (M24).

This is a sparse cluster with a linear diameter of 8.04 pc, a tidal radius of 7.3 pc, and is centrally concentrated with core radius of 0.012 pc. It has one definite Be star and 29 B-type stars in total. There are three supergiant stars, all of class A or earlier. The brightest component (lucida), designated HD 168352, is a B-type giant star with a class of B2 III and a visual magnitude of 8.65.

Messier 18 is 1,296 pc from the Earth and 6,830 pc from the Galactic Center. It is orbiting the Milky Way core with a period of 186.5 million years and an eccentricity of 0.02. This carries it to as close as 6.5 kpc to, and as far as 6.8 kpc from the galactic core. It passes vertically through the galactic plane once every 27.4 million years, ranging no more than 80 pc above or below.

As of January 2022, Messier 18 is one of the few remaining objects within the Messier Catalog to not have been photographed by the Hubble Space Telescope.

Gallery

See also
 List of Messier objects

References

External links

 

Messier 018
Carina–Sagittarius Arm
Messier 018
018
Messier 018
17640603